The kit fox (Vulpes macrotis) is a fox species that inhabits arid and semi-arid regions of the southwestern United States and northern and central Mexico. These foxes are the smallest of the four species of Vulpes occurring in North America and are among the smallest of the vulpines worldwide. It has also been called a North American counterpart of the fennec fox due to its large ears.

Taxonomy
Some mammalogists classify it as conspecific with the swift fox, V. velox, but molecular systematics imply that the two species are distinct.
Interbreeding between the two species does occur where their ranges overlap (eastern New Mexico and western Texas), but this hybridization is quite restricted in scope.

Subspecific designations for the species are not fully addressed. As many as eight subspecies have been recognized, although further analyzes have not found support for any subspecies differentiation. However, although there is a clear need for more subspecific clarification, most available data suggest that kit foxes in the San Joaquin Valley of California are likely to warrant a subspecific designation, V. m. mutica, due to geographical isolation, and that any other kit foxes may be included in a second subspecies, V. m. macrotis.

Subspecies
The endangered San Joaquin kit fox (Vulpes macrotis mutica) was formerly very common in the San Joaquin Valley and through much of Central California. Its 1990 population was estimated to be 7,000. This subspecies is still endangered, after nearly 50 years of being on the Endangered Species List. Officially, this subspecies was listed March 3, 1967.  On September 26, 2007, Wildlands Inc. announced the designation of the 684 acre (277 ha) Deadman Creek Conservation Bank, which is intended specifically to protect habitat of the San Joaquin kit fox. However, the population continues to decline mostly due to heavy habitat loss. Other factors include competition from red foxes and the extermination of the wolf from California, which has left the coyote as the dominant meso-predator in kit fox territory, bringing an imbalance in ecosystem relationships.

Appearance
The kit fox is one of the smallest species of the family Canidae found in North America. This species exhibits little sexual dimorphism, with the male being slightly larger.

The color and texture of the coat vary geographically. In general, the dorsal color is grizzled or yellowish-gray. The grizzled appearance is the result of guard hairs that are typically black-tipped or with two black bands separated by a white band. The guard hairs are less than 50 mm long, and particularly prominent in the middle of the back. The soles of the legs are protected by stiff tufts of hair, a trait that improves traction on loose sandy surfaces as well as protection against extreme temperatures; muzzles and vibrissae are generally black to brown. The tail is bushy and gray, with a black tip, and the caudal gland has a pronounced black spot. Unlike the gray fox, it has no stripe along the length of its tail. Its color ranges from yellow to gray, and the back is usually darker than the majority of its coat; its belly and inner ears are usually lighter. It has distinct dark patches around the nose. The ears are tan or gray on the back, turning to buff or orange at the base. The shoulders, the lower sides, the flanks, and the strip about 25 mm wide across the chest range in color from buffy to orange.

Distribution and habitat
The northernmost part of its range is the arid interior of Oregon. Its eastern limit is southwestern Colorado. It can be found south through Nevada, Utah, southeastern California, Arizona, New Mexico, and into western Texas.

Kit foxes inhabit arid and semi-arid regions encompassing desert scrub, chaparral, halophytic regions, and grasslands. Generally, areas with sparse ground cover are favored. Vegetation habitats vary with the regional fauna, but some examples are sagebrush Artemisia tridentata and saltbrush Atriplex polycarpa. Loose textured soils may be prioritized for denning. Kit Foxes can also be found in agricultural areas, in particular orchards, on a small basis, and can even inhabit urban areas.

Behavior

Kit foxes are mostly nocturnal and sometimes crepuscular; they escape heat stress during the day by resting in underground dens. Kit foxes normally forage on their own. Kit foxes are not exceptionally territorial, preferring to live in pairs or small groups of relatives.

Dens are used during the year for daytime resting, escaping predators, avoiding extreme heat, preserving moisture, and carrying and rearing young. Kit Foxes will dig their own dens, but they can also modify and use the burrows of badgers, ground squirrels, prairie dogs, and kangaroo rats. Dens are spread across the home range, and an individual fox usually uses more than 11 dens in a given year. They normally rest in their dens during the day, but sometimes can emerge to bask and, when pups are young, to play.

In comparison to many canids that pants only at the resonant frequency of the thorax, kit foxes pants at a rate proportional to the ambient temperature before the rate exceeds the resonant frequency. In doing so, kit foxes exercise the economics of water at the cost of energy. The apparent velocity of kit foxes is essentially an illusion created by their limited size and cryptic coloration, and their incredible ability to evade and change directions. An accurate account clocked a fox kit at around 40 km/h in front of the car, but the fox was easily exhausted.

Diet
Kit foxes are opportunistic omnivores and scavengers, possibly regulated by prey abundance, but primarily carnivorous. In the Californian deserts, its primary prey is Merriam's kangaroo rat (Dipodomys merriami). Other common prey species include lagomorphs, rodents and insects. Kit foxes also consume birds, reptiles, carrion, fish, and rarely, plant material, such as tomatoes (Lycopersicon esculentum), cactus fruits (Carnegiea gigantea) and other fruits. Different kit fox families can occupy the same hunting grounds, but do not generally go hunting at the same time. Kit foxes are also known to cache food and eat human food. Black-tailed jackrabbits represent the upper size limit of prey.

Mating and reproduction

The kit fox is a socially monogamous species,  and the mated pair remains together throughout the year. However, polygamous mating relationships have been observed. Female foxes begin searching for natal dens in September and October and usually usable dens are visited and cleaned of debris before the final selection is made. No nest as such is built, but new entrances and tunnels can be added to the den. As with most canids, copulation ends with a "tie" during which the penis is locked in the female's vagina. 

Females are monoestrous. Male and female kit foxes usually establish mating pairs during October and November, and they mate from December to January-February. Gestation lasts probably around 49–56 days, and the litters are born in February or March; litter size is usually four or five, and the sex ratio is roughly even. They do not emerge from the den until they are at least four weeks old, and are weaned after about eight weeks and become independent at five to six months old. They become sexually mature at 10 months. Both parents take part in raising and protecting their young. Pups emerge from the den at about one month of age and spend several hours each day playing outside the entrance. The male seems to do most of the hunting during this period, and later, both parents provide food until the pups start to forage with them at three to four months of age.

Survival and mortality rates of kit foxes can vary significantly year to year. In captivity, they have lived 10 to 12 years; while the average lifespan of a wild kit fox is 5.5 years. One Californian study of 144 kit fox pups showed a 74% mortality rate in pups within the first year.

References

External links

ARKive – images and movies of the kit fox (Vulpes macrotis)
NPS - information about Kit Fox in Joshua Tree National Park

kit fox
Carnivorans of North America
Mammals of Mexico
Mammals of the United States
Fauna of the Southwestern United States
Fauna of the Western United States
Fauna of the Baja California Peninsula
Fauna of the Sonoran Desert
Fauna of the Colorado Desert
Fauna of Northern Mexico
Least concern biota of the United States
Least concern biota of North America
kit fox
Taxa named by Clinton Hart Merriam